Miguel Martínez (born March 23, 1991) is a Cuban Greco-Roman wrestler. He competed in the men's Greco-Roman 66 kg event at the 2016 Summer Olympics, in which he was eliminated in the round of 32 by Rasul Chunayev.

References

External links
 

1991 births
Living people
Cuban male sport wrestlers
Olympic wrestlers of Cuba
Wrestlers at the 2016 Summer Olympics
Pan American Games medalists in wrestling
Pan American Games bronze medalists for Cuba
Wrestlers at the 2015 Pan American Games
Medalists at the 2015 Pan American Games
21st-century Cuban people